Liolaemus hatcheri is a species of lizard in the family  Liolaemidae. It is native to Argentina.

References

hatcheri
Reptiles described in 1909
Taxa named by Leonhard Stejneger
Reptiles of Argentina